Dumitru Alexe (21 March 1935 – 17 May 1971) was a Romanian sprint canoeist, who had his best achievements in doubles, partnering with Simion Ismailciuc. They won an Olympic gold medal in 1956, a European title in 1957 and a world title in 1958. At the 1960 Olympics Dunitru competed with Igor Lipalit and placed fourth.

References

External links

 
 
 

1935 births
1971 deaths
Canoeists at the 1956 Summer Olympics
Canoeists at the 1960 Summer Olympics
Olympic gold medalists for Romania
Olympic canoeists of Romania
Romanian male canoeists
Olympic medalists in canoeing
ICF Canoe Sprint World Championships medalists in Canadian
Medalists at the 1956 Summer Olympics
20th-century Romanian people